L'Essentiel is a compilation album by Mano Negra, released on 28 May 2004.

Track listing

Personnel

2004 compilation albums
Mano Negra (band) albums